Cricket Wireless is an American prepaid wireless service provider, owned by AT&T. It provides wireless services to ten million subscribers in the United States. Cricket Wireless was founded in March 1999 by Leap Wireless International. AT&T acquired Leap Wireless International in March 2014, and later merged Cricket Wireless operations with Aio Wireless. Cricket Wireless competes primarily against T-Mobile's Metro, Dish's Boost Mobile and Verizon's Visible in the prepaid wireless segment.

History

Cricket Wireless was founded in March 1999 by Leap Wireless International. AT&T acquired Leap Wireless International in March 2014 and merged Cricket Wireless with Aio Wireless. Before AT&T's acquisition, the company had 4.5 million subscribers.

Cricket's first market was Chattanooga, Tennessee, in 1999 and through much of its early growth became known as a network focused on small, rural markets.

In September 2007, MetroPCS, Cricket Wireless's competing carrier at the time, announced a $5.3 billion bid to merge with Leap Wireless. Leap informally rejected the bid less than two weeks later. MetroPCS officially withdrew the bid less than two months later. In December 2007, Cricket acquired Hargray Communications Group's wireless telecommunications business.

In September 2008, Cricket and MetroPCS entered into a ten-year roaming agreement covering both companies' existing and future markets. The companies also entered into a spectrum exchange agreement covering licenses in certain markets. In November 2008, they launched "Premium Extended Coverage", a roaming partnership with 14 wireless companies. In August 2010, Cricket and Sprint signed a five-year wholesale agreement (MVNO) which allowed Cricket to utilize Sprint's nationwide 3G EVDO network in the United States.

In late 2010 at CES 2011, Cricket unveiled Muve Music, the carriers own music streaming service alongside the $199 Samsung Suede SCH-r710 which was the first phone to support Muve Music and included a 4GB SD Card to store music on. Muve Music was initially included in its own $55 plan but was later expanded to all plans as a $5 add-on before being included in all plans free-of-charge. The music service was deemed by Cricket as a major success and credited with helping drive up at least 100,000 new subscribers in the course of a few months. Muve Music originally required an SD Card with a capacity of at least 4GBs to download music, the ability to do so without an SD Card was introduced in version 4.0 of Muve Music but required an internal storage capacity of at least 4GBs. Muve Music 4.0 was officially unveiled on the Samsung Galaxy S III, Samsung Galaxy S4 and Samsung Galaxy Discover while the Samsung Galaxy Admire would ship with version 3.5 but was upgradeable to version 4.0. At its peak, the service was the biggest music streaming service in regards to paying customers with a customer base of 2.3 million users and was hinted in making appearances in international markets such as in Brazil. The fate of the service was put in doubt after the acquisition of Crickets parent company, Leap Wireless, by AT&T and was rumored to be merged with AT&Ts own Beats Music service or possibly left as-is. AT&T expressed a lack of interest in maintaining the service and discontinued it in May 2014. AT&T made Muve Music inaccessible to any new phone purchased after the merger but allowed legacy handsets bought before the merger to access the service. The service was acquired by Deezer for $100 million and formally shut down on February 7, 2015. Deezer offered all Cricket customers a discounted $6 plan which was made available on January 31, 2015. Cricket offers a variety of phones including most of the latest iPhone and Android models.

In July 2013, AT&T agreed to buy Cricket Wireless' parent for $1.2 billion. The FCC approved the acquisition between AT&T and Leap Wireless in March 2014. In doing so, AT&T merged its own Aio Wireless prepaid brand into Cricket to form the "New Cricket". Cricket Wireless began a gradual shutdown of its CDMA network in March 2015 before a total shutdown in September 2015 and moved all users over to AT&Ts GSM network. All users were required to buy new devices in order to be able to maintain connectivity to the new Cricket network. Cricket Wireless, alongside AT&T, shut down its 2G networks on December 31, 2016. Customers with legacy handsets were also required to upgrade their devices to use on newer networks.

Cricket Wireless deployed its 5G network nationwide on August 21, 2020. Shortly afterward, Cricket announced the shutdown of its 3G network starting in February 2022.

Coverage network

Prior to its acquisition by AT&T, Cricket's CDMA network used its home network and roaming agreements with Sprint, among other CDMA carriers. However, Cricket's CDMA network was shut down and the spectrum was reframed for use on AT&T's HSPA+ and LTE networks. Following the acquisition by AT&T, Cricket Wireless released devices that use AT&T's 3G, 4G, and 4G LTE networks.

Cricket Wireless noted on its old website that CDMA service would be terminated as early as September 2015. Most devices prior to the merger would not be compatible on the GSM network except the iPhone 4s, iPhone 5, iPhone 5c, and iPhone 5s. Compatible iPhone devices would only require a new SIM card.

Controversies

CDMA phones
In May 2015, Cricket Wireless was sued for selling CDMA phones that would not work after the merger with AT&T. The lawsuit alleged that Cricket knew at the time of the merger with AT&T that any devices sold would soon need to be replaced because AT&T's network did not support CDMA devices and yet continued to do so. The lawsuit further stated that "AT&T and Cricket had decided to discontinue the CDMA network and require Cricket customers to use AT&T's GSM cellular network" yet continued to sell the devices, and due to Cricket's policy of not unlocking cellphones at that time, "the cellphones became useless and worthless." The court ruled in favor of the plaintiff and Cricket was forced to either unlock the locked cell phones, provide 1 month of free service on the 1GB plan for former customers and waive the activation fee, or provide current customers with one extra gigabyte of data for four months.

A similar lawsuit was filed by the Attorney General of Maryland in June 2020 for violating the state's consumer protection act.

STARTTLS stripping attack
In October 2014, Cricket Wireless (and its parent company, AT&T) came under scrutiny for intercepting and modifying its customers' email traffic to downgrade and prevent encryption of the conversation and its metadata. An engineer at a digital security and privacy firm, Golden Frog, first noticed the issue in September 2013 via his Aio Wireless connection (later acquired by Cricket). Upon further investigation by the privacy firm in June 2014, Golden Frog determined that Cricket masked the STARTTLS command in email server responses, thereby "putting its customers at serious risk by inhibiting their ability to protect online communications." In October, a Washington Post investigation revealed that "Cricket did not address repeated questions about the issue and did not alert customers, many of whom rely on Cricket as their sole Internet service, that they would not be able to protect their e-mails from prying eyes. AT&T, which absorbed Cricket when it acquired Leap Wireless that spring, did not respond to a request for comment." The EFF also published a technical analysis condemning ISPs like Cricket for tampering with customer internet traffic.

See also
 AT&T Mobility, another subsidiary of AT&T
 AT&T Prepaid, AT&T Mobility's prepaid service

References

External links
 
 Cricket Newsroom
 Official Instagram site

Telecommunications companies established in 1999
Retail companies established in 1999
American companies established in 1999
AT&T subsidiaries
Mobile phone companies of the United States
Mobile virtual network operators
Companies based in Atlanta
1999 establishments in Illinois
2014 mergers and acquisitions